Drina discophora  is a butterfly in the family Lycaenidae. It was described by Cajetan Felder and Rudolf Felder in 1862. It is  endemic to the Philippines (Mindoro).

References

External links
"Drina de Nicéville in Marshall & de Nicéville, 1890" at Markku Savela's Lepidoptera and Some Other Life Forms

Drina (butterfly)
Butterflies described in 1862